Virgil L. Fabian is an American television director and producer. He is best known for his directing episodes of the Nickelodeon series All That, Kenan & Kel, The Amanda Show and Drake & Josh. In 2001, he received an ALMA Award nomination for his directing work on The Brothers García.

His last directing credit was for a 2007 episode of Drake & Josh.

Credits
 The All New Mickey Mouse Club (1989, director)
 Allegra's Window (1994-1996, director)
 Family Matters (1995, second assistant director)
 The Mystery Files of Shelby Woo (1996, stage manager)
 Kenan & Kel (1997, stage manager; 1998–2000, director)
 All That (2000–2004, director and producer)
 The Amanda Show (2000-2002, director)
 The Brothers García (2000-2001, director)
 Drake & Josh (2004-2007, director)
 The Adventures of Tango McNorton: Licensed Hero (2006, TV short film, producer)

References

External links

American television directors
American television producers
Living people
Place of birth missing (living people)
Year of birth missing (living people)